A metachronal swimming or metachronal rowing is the swimming technique used by animals with multiple pairs of swimming legs.  In this technique, appendages are sequentially stroked in a back-to-front wave moving along the animal’s body. In literature, while metachronal rhythm or metachronal wave usually refer to the movement of cilia; metachronal coordination, metachronal beating, metachronal swimming or metachronal rowing usually refer to the leg movement of arthropods, such as mantis shrimp, copepods, antarctic krill etc. though all of them refer to the similar locomotion pattern.

Metachronous indicates something not functioning or occurring synchronously, or occurring or starting at different times. This word is derived from Greek meta- μετά- meaning, occurring later than or in succession to : after, and -chronous -Χρόνος meaning, of (such) a time or period.

Swimming legs should coordinate to avoid interference among appendage pairs. To accomplish this challenge, almost all free-swimming crustaceans adapted to some version of metachronism.

Significance 
Ecologically and economically important crustaceans such as copepods, krill, shrimp, crayfish, and lobsters use metachronal swimming for locomotion. Using this technique, animals propel significant portion of earth's aquatic biomass. As an example, the biomass of a sole metachronally swimming species, the Antarctic krill Euphausia superba, is more than the total adult human biomass. Moreover, this technique is important from biomechanics point of view because it has been adapted to perform extreme swimming actions. The highest animal acceleration of 200 m/s^2, for example, belongs to the escape jump of the copepod Calanus finmarchicus. On the other hand, Antarctic krill uses metachronal swimming to efficiently migrate distances up to 10 km per day.

It is believed that, during power stroke appendages are subject to drag which creates forward thrust, during the recovery stroke appendages are folded towards body to reduce the drag. Furthermore, back-to-front swimming pattern is thought to be more efficient than front-to-back or synchronous pattern.

Examples from nature

Cilia in metazoa
Knight-Jones defines the types of metachronism in ciliary beat of metazoa depending on the relative direction of wave to the effective beat. If the effective beat is in the same direction as metachronal wave, then it is called as symplectic metachronal wave. If opposite, the wave is called antiplectic. There are cases where the wave is directed to the right or to the left of the effective beat. In these cases the metachronal wave is called dexioplectic if effective beat is to the right of the wave, and laeoplectic if effective beat is to the left of the wave.

Mantis shrimp 
Mantis shrimp have 5 pairs of pleopods which they use to swim. Kinematics of their swimming reveals metachronal pattern. Study by Campos et al. shows that the power stroke of the mantis shrimp (Odontodactylus Havanensis) is metachronal, creating back-to-front wave motion. While power stroke is completed metachronally, recovery stroke occurs nearly synchronous. The same rowing pattern was observed by another study. Stein et al. also report the metachronal rowing in mantis shrimp in their study

Copepods 
Metachronism in copepods was observed by numerous studies. Copepods show metachronal beating pattern while foraging and escape movements. In this study by van Duren and Videler, it was observed that during foraging, copepods metachronally beat their first three mouth appendages (antennae, mandibular palps and maxillules) creating backward motion of water. During escape, their mouth appendages stop moving and swimming legs beat in a very fast metachronal rhythm, accelerating a jet of water backwards.

Slow-motion video by Jiang and Kiorboe reveals the metachronal beating of legs of cyclopoid copepod Oithona davisae during jumping. In this video, last pair of legs initiate the power stroke followed by the adjacent pair. Power stroke ends with the first pair. While power stroke is metachronal, recovery stroke is near synchronous.

Antarctic krill 
Antarctic krill swim in a metachronal fashion. They have several swimming modes which include hovering, fast-forward swimming and upside-down swimming. All these swimming modes have common metachronal pattern although their kinematics differ. Hovering (HOV), which is defined as the swimming mode corresponding to the body angles of 25-50° and normalized speeds less than half of a body length per second, is performed at lower pleopod amplitudes and lower beat frequencies as compared to fast-forward swimming (FFW). FFW is defined as the swimming mode corresponding to speeds higher than 2 body lengths per second without restriction to body angles. Typical swimming speeds in this study was found as 0.25, 4 and 1.6 body lengths per second, and typical beat frequencies were found as 3, 6.2 and 3.8 Hz for hovering, fast-forward swimming and upside-down swimming, respectively. The average animal size was about 4 cm

Metachronal rowing seems to be efficient propulsive aid for Antarctic krill to travel long distances. Study done by Alben et al. show that metachronal rhythm produce larger average propulsion velocity compared to more synchronous stroke rhythms.

See also 
 Metachronal rhythm

References 

Animal locomotion